The 2020 United States House of Representatives elections in Utah was held on November 3, 2020, to elect the four U.S. representatives from the state of Utah, one from each of the state's four congressional districts. The elections coincided with the 2020 U.S. presidential election, as well as other elections to the House of Representatives, elections to the United States Senate and various state and local elections.

Overview
Registered voters: 1,682,512. Turnout: 1,515,845 (90.09%)

By district

District 1

The 1st district is located in northern Utah, including the cities of Ogden, Logan, Park City, Layton, Clearfield, and the northern half of the Great Salt Lake. The incumbent is Republican Rob Bishop, who was re-elected with 61.6% of the vote in 2018, and announced in August 2017 that this term would be his final term.

Republican primary

Candidates

Declared
Tina Cannon, Morgan County councilwoman
J.C. DeYoung
Doug Durbano, businessman and lawyer
Chadwick Fairbanks, property manager
Kerry Gibson, Utah Commissioner of Agriculture and Food and former Weber County commissioner
Catherine Brenchley Hammon
Zach Hartman, real estate investment advisor
Blake Moore, former U.S. foreign service officer
Mark Shepherd, mayor of Clearfield
Bob Stevenson, Davis County commissioner
Howard Wallack, retired business executive
Katie Witt, mayor of Kaysville and former Longmont city councilwoman

Declined
Rob Bishop, incumbent U.S. Representative
Francis Gibson, majority leader of the Utah House of Representatives
F. Ann Millner, state senator
Mike Schultz, majority whip of the Utah House of Representatives
Chris Stewart, incumbent U.S. Representative (for the 2nd district)
Stan Summers, Box Elder County commissioner
Todd Weiler, state senator
Logan Wilde, state representative
Brad Wilson, speaker of the Utah House of Representatives

Endorsements

Convention results

Polling

Primary results

Democratic primary

Candidates

Declared
 Jamie Cheek, college debate coach and rehabilitation counselor
 Darren Parry, chairman of the Northwestern Band of the Shoshone Nation

Convention results

Polling
Polls with a sample size of <100 are marked in red to indicate a lack of reliability.

Primary results

General election

Predictions

Polling

with Generic Republican and Generic Democrat

Results

District 2

The 2nd district encompasses both Salt Lake City and the rural western and southern parts of the state. The incumbent is Republican Chris Stewart, who was re-elected with 56.1% of the vote in 2018.

Republican primary

Candidates

Declared
 Chris Stewart, incumbent U.S. Representative

Eliminated at convention
 Mary Burkett, candidate for Utah House of Representatives in 2012 and for Utah's 2nd congressional district in 2018
 Ty Jensen, political podcaster and 2018 candidate for United States Senate
 Carson Jorgensen, farmer

Polling

Democratic primary

Candidates

Declared
Kael Weston, college professor and former U.S. State Department official

Eliminated at convention
Randy Hopkins, former regional director for the Utah State Workforce Department
Larry Livingston, former IRS agent

Polling
Polls with a sample size of <100 are marked in red to indicate a lack of reliability.

General election

Predictions

Polling

with Generic Republican and Generic Democrat

Results

District 3

The 3rd district includes rural southeastern Utah, stretches into the Provo-Orem metro area, and takes in the southeastern Salt Lake City suburbs of Holladay, Cottonwood Heights, Sandy, and Draper. The incumbent is Republican John Curtis, who was re-elected with 67.5% of the vote in 2018.

Republican primary

Candidates

Declared
John Curtis, incumbent U.S. Representative

Polling

wDemocratic primary

Candidates

Declared
Devin D. Thorpe, nonprofit founder

Eliminated at convention
Jared Anderson
Trey Robinson

Polling
Polls with a sample size of <100 are marked in red to indicate a lack of reliability.

Independents

Candidates

Withdrew
Russel Fugal, former Utah Republican Party delegate

General election

Predictions

Polling

with Generic Republican and Generic Democrat

Results

District 4

The 4th district is based in southwest Salt Lake County, taking in parts of West Valley City and Salt Lake City, as well as South Salt Lake, Taylorsville, Murray, West Jordan, Midvale, South Jordan, Riverton, Herriman, and Bluffdale. The district also stretches south into eastern Utah County, western Juab County, and northern Sanpete County. The incumbent is Democrat Ben McAdams, who flipped the district and was elected with 50.1% of the vote in 2018.

Democratic primary

Candidates

Declared
 Ben McAdams, incumbent U.S. Representative

Defeated at convention
 Daniel Beckstrand, dental office manager

Endorsements

Polling
Polls with a sample size of <100 are marked in red to indicate a lack of reliability.

Republican primary

Candidates

Declared
Kathleen Anderson, communications director for the Utah Republican Party
Chris Biesinger, family nurse practitioner and Utah National Guardsman
Trent Christensen, CEO of venture capitalist firm and former regional finance director for Mitt Romney's 2012 presidential campaign
Kim Coleman, state representative
Jay McFarland, radio personality
Burgess Owens, former NFL player and CEO of Second Chance 4 Youth
Cindy Thompson

Withdrawn
Dan Hemmert, state senate majority whip

Declined
Dan McCay, state senator (running for Lieutenant Governor of Utah)
Aimee Winder Newton, Salt Lake County councilwoman (running for Governor of Utah)

Endorsements

Polling

with Dan Hemmert, and Jefferson Moss

Convention results

Primary results

United Utah Party

Candidates

Declared
Jonia Broderick, author

General election

Endorsements

Predictions

Polling

With Jay McFarland

with Generic Republican

with Generic Democrat and Generic Republican

Results

Notes

Partisan clients

References

External links
 
 
  (State affiliate of the U.S. League of Women Voters)
 

Official campaign websites for 1st district candidates
 Blake Moore (R) for Congress
 Darren Parry (D) for Congress

Official campaign websites for 2nd district candidates
 Rob Latham (L) for Congress
 Chris Stewart (R) for Congress
 Kael Weston (D) for Congress

Official campaign websites for 3rd district candidates
 John Curtis (R) for Congress
 Thomas G. McNeill (UU) for Congress
 Trey Robinson (I) for Congress
 Devin D. Thorpe (D) for Congress

Official campaign websites for 4th district candidates
 Jonia Broderick (UU) for Congress
 Ben McAdams (D) for Congress
 John Molnar (L) for Congress
 Burgess Owens (R) for Congress

Utah
2020
House